Romance Out of the Blue is a 2015 Chinese romantic comedy film directed by Ning Ying. The film was released on October 23, 2015.

Cast
Xia Yu
Guan Xiaotong
Roy Chiu
Liu Zi
Cui Baoyue
Congo Pax
Zuo Li

Reception
The film has earned  at the Chinese box office.

References

2015 romantic comedy films
Chinese romantic comedy films
Films directed by Ning Ying
2010s Mandarin-language films